Sigurd Konrad Magnussøn (December 14, 1889 – November 12, 1961) was a Norwegian theater director and actor.

On August 14, 1912 he married the actress Abigael Heber.

Magnussøn was a student at the Fahlstrøm Theater from 1906 to 1907. From 1908 to 1911 and from 1912 to 1920 he was an actor at the National Theater in Oslo. Then he was at the National Theater in Bergen from 1921 to 1922. In 1921 and 1922 he also directed the experimental Intimteatret theater, where Agnes Mowinckel debuted as a stage director and Olafr Havrevold debuted as an actor. From 1922 to 1931 he was engaged at Chat Noir, the Trondheim National Theater, the Casino Theater in Oslo, and the Oslo New Theater. From 1931 to 1935 he was at the Norwegian Theater. His last theater was the National Theater in Oslo. He was employed there from 1936 until the theater was closed by the German occupation authorities in 1942 and, when the theater was reopened in 1945, he returned to the National Theater.

Sigurd Magnussøn also appeared in a number of Norwegian films. Both he and his wife Abigael starred in the blockbuster film Fant, which premiered in 1937.

Filmography
1935: Samhold må til as the office manager
1937: Fant as Peder
1939: Gjest Baardsen as a constable
1939: Gryr i Norden as the factory manager
1940: Tørres Snørtevold as the bailiff
1941: Kjærlighet og vennskap as the doctor
1941: Gullfjellet as the council head
1941: Nygift as the manufacturer Fritjof Jensen
1942: Trysil-Knut as the bailiff
1946: Vi vil leve as the doctor at Grini
1946: Englandsfarere as the skipper
1947: Sankt Hans fest as an official
1951: Storfolk og småfolk as a judge
1952: Andrine og Kjell as Mr. Bergan
1952: Trine! as Pandahl, an auditor
1953: Flukt fra paradiset as the principal
1954: Portrettet as Langerud, a teacher
1954: I moralens navn as old Krahn-Johnsen

References

External links
 

1889 births
1961 deaths
Norwegian male stage actors
20th-century Norwegian male actors
Norwegian theatre directors
People from Skien